Shirley Thelma  Griffiths (born March 1948)  is a Church in Wales priest: most notably Archdeacon of Wrexham from  2010 to 2013.

She was educated at Bangor University and ordained in 1995. After  a curacy in East Cowton she was the Vicar of Abergele.

References

1953 births
Living people
Archdeacons of Wrexham
Alumni of Bangor University
20th-century Welsh Anglican priests
21st-century Welsh Anglican priests
Women Anglican clergy